Jacinto Cascales was an Argentine film editor. Cascales edited more than forty films during his career.

Selected filmography
 The Path to Crime (1951)
 With the Music in my Soul (1951)
 The Three Musketeers (1953)
 The Terrace (1963)
 Story of a Poor Young Man (1968)

References

Bibliography 
 Cowie, Peter. World Filmography: 1967. Fairleigh Dickinson Univ Press, 1977.

External links 
 

Year of birth unknown
Year of death unknown
Argentine film editors